Acrodipsas cuprea, the copper ant-blue or cuprea ant-blue, is a butterfly of the family Lycaenidae. It is found in Australia, from southern Queensland to Victoria.

The wingspan is about 20 mm.

The larvae feed on the larvae of Crematogaster ant species.

External links
Australian Caterpillars

Acrodipsas
Butterflies of Australia
Butterflies described in 1965